The CSV qualification for the 2006 FIVB Volleyball Men's World Championship saw member nations compete for two places at the finals in Japan.

Draw
Seven CSV national teams entered qualification. The teams were distributed according to their position in the FIVB Senior Men's Rankings as of 15 January 2004 using the serpentine system for their distribution. (Rankings shown in brackets)

First round

First round

Pool A
Venue:  Polideportivo Islas Malvinas, Mar del Plata, Argentina
Dates: May 6–8, 2005
All times are Argentina Time (UTC−03:00)

|}

|}

Pool B
Venue:  Gimnasio Gastón Portillo, Caracas, Venezuela
Dates: July 22–24, 2005
All times are Venezuelan Standard Time (UTC−04:30)

|}

|}

References

External links
 2006 World Championship Qualification

2006 FIVB Volleyball Men's World Championship
2005 in volleyball